Corazziere was the name of at least two ships of the Italian Navy and may refer to:

 , a  launched in 1909 and discarded in 1928.
 , a  launched in 1938 and scuttled in 1943. Refloated and again sunk in 1944.

Italian Navy ship names